Aditya Srivastava (born 21 July 1968) is an Indian actor who works in Hindi films, television and theatre. He is best known for his role as Senior Inspector Abhijeet in India's longest-running television police procedural C.I.D.. He has also portrayed pivotal roles in the Bollywood films Satya, Gulaal, Lakshya, Paanch, Black Friday, Kaalo, Super 30 and Dil Se Pooch Kidhar Jana Hai.

Personal life
Aditya had an arranged marriage to a psychologist Manasi Srivasatava in year 2003. They had a daughter born in 2005 and another daughter in 2007.

Career
While pursuing graduation from Allahabad University, Aditya Srivastava did theatre plays at Sangeet Samiti, Civil lines, Allahabad. To hone his skills and pursue a career in acting, he moved to Delhi in 1989 and was involved in mostly theatre work at Sri Ram Center Of Performing Arts. Spotted by Shekhar Kapoor, he got his first break in the movie Bandit Queen, where he played Puttilal. After this, he moved to Mumbai in 1995. He did many voiceovers for promos and advertisements. He also played pivotal episodic roles in Byomkesh Bakshi, Rishtey and Aahat. Naya Daur, 9 Malabar Hill and Yeh Shaadi Nahi Ho Sakti had him in full-fledged and prominent roles. He took a break from television in 1997 to do films.

He was later offered C.I.D. in 1999, after B. P. Singh noticed him in Satya for playing a cop, after Ashutosh Gowariker left to pursue direction. Although he had played as a criminal Paresh in the C.I.D. episode "The Case of the Stolen Gun" by then. Initially reluctant, he signed in for just 26 episodes, which however extended later. His first C.I.D. episode as a cop was "The Case of the Stolen Dynamite". He, today, is one of the pillars of the show.

Meanwhile, he also did many films. He played Murgi, a guitarist in Anurag Kashyap's Paanch, which was shot in 2001, and was never released, but got his approval as an actor by the film fraternity when Paanch was shown as the closing film in Osian's Cinefan Festival of Asian and Arab Cinema in 2005. He was offered to play the male lead in Hansal Mehta's Dil Pe Mat Le Yaar, but the role was later given to Manoj Bajpayee, leaving him to play another important character in the same movie named Tito, a Dubai returned entrepreneur. He even provided finance for the making of this movie. His first film as in playing the single male protagonist, Dil Se Pooch Kidhar Jaana Hai, fetched him appreciation by critics for his performance, though it was a commercial failure as the production house decided to release its sans promotions. He was in lead in Kaalo . He suffered a shoulder injury in a bus accident during the shoots of Kaalo.

Internationally, he is more known for his work in films like Dil Se.., Mohandas, Dansh, Satya, Matrubhoomi, Black Friday and Gulaal, all of which ran successfully across the International Film Festivals Circuit and had him as critically acclaimed parallel lead. He did many other films and made his presence known in each one of them, as claimed by critics. He prefers non-conventional cinema as it brings depth to his acting, as said by him in an interview.

He is named in the Guinness Book of World Records for shooting the longest uncut sequence in the episode The Inheritance of C.I.D.

A song was recorded for a C.I.D. episode (aired on 21 January 2012), which was a lullaby sung by Aditya Srivastava and his fellow actors Shivaji Satam and Dayanand Shetty. Aditya Srivastava, Shivaji Satam, Dayanand Shetty and Narendra Gupta also appeared in Kaun Banega Crorepati 2014 to raise money for charity.

After a hiatus owing to his tight schedule in the television industry, he is back to the big screen. As for 2016, his movies Julie 2 and Brina are due to release.

Filmography

Film

Television

References

External links

Indian male film actors
Indian male television actors
Indian male voice actors
Male actors in Hindi cinema
Living people
Indian male models
University of Allahabad alumni
Male actors from Allahabad
20th-century Indian male actors
21st-century Indian male actors
1968 births